Oeiras may refer to:

Places

Brazil
 Oeiras, Piauí, a municipality in the State of Piauí
 Oeiras do Pará, Pará, a municipality in the State of Pará

Portugal
 Oeiras, Portugal, a municipality in the district of Lisbon
 Oeiras e São Julião da Barra, a former civil parish in the municipality of Oeiras
 Oeiras e São Julião da Barra, Paço de Arcos e Caxias, successor of the above